"Infra Turbo Pigcart Racer" is a song by Canadian electronic music producer Deadmau5, released as the third single from his seventh studio album While(1<2) on 3 June 2014.

Background
The song, alike the track "Fn Pig" from his previous album, Album Title Goes Here, is named after a YouTube video that Zimmerman uploaded where he is playing Minecraft, attempting to get a pig into a minecart. Eventually he (now infamously) yelled "Get in the cart! Fucking pig!". This led to several demo tracks uploaded to his SoundCloud account being named after the line (e.g "Get In the Cart, Pig" and "Get In the October Cart, Pig"). The song samples audio of deadmau5's Ferrari 458 Italia while driving on Toronto's Lake Shore Boulevard.

In 2013, Zimmerman uploaded a demo of the track to his SoundCloud account, titled "Infra Super Turbo Pigcart Racer". A slightly different version of the demo, with a shorter intro, was simply titled "Turbo Pig Cart Racer" and was made available on his website in January 2014.

Another variant of the track, "Get In The Pig, Meowingtons", was also uploaded to live.deadmau5.com in early 2014. The track was a mashup of "Turbo Pig Cart Racer" with another unreleased song, "Meowingtons Enables Hax". While this version never appeared on a studio album, it was re-released by Zimmerman in 2017 on his compilation album Stuff i used to do, where it was re-titled "HaxPigMeow".

Release
The song was initially uploaded to Mau5trap's SoundCloud account on June 2, 2014, before being officially released on June 3, 2014 on iTunes and Beatport.

Reception
Nick Murray of Rolling Stone observed that the song "substitutes the rising-and-falling template for most EDM with a driving house beat that perhaps imitates both the length and the excitement of the long race". Exclaim! writer Alex Hudson remarked: "There's a stripped-down break in the middle of it all, but otherwise, this one is sure to get the kids dancing." In 2017, "Infra Turbo Pigcart Racer" was ranked number 16 on Billboards list of the 20 best deadmau5 songs. Writer Kat Bein said that the song "has got to be one of the most unique weapons in deadmau5' musical arsenal."

Track listing
Track listing taken from Beatport

Charts

References

2014 singles
2014 songs
Deadmau5 songs
Songs written by Deadmau5